Vandoncourt is a commune in the Doubs department in the Bourgogne-Franche-Comté region in eastern France.

Geography 
It occupies a transitional position between the Vosges Mountains and Alsace to the north and the Jura mountains on the south, Switzerland on the east and the plain of the river Saône on the west.

It is perched on a high plateau, which dominates the region.

Population

See also
 Communes of the Doubs department

References

External links

 Vandoncourt on the regional Web site 

Communes of Doubs